Jørgen Kieler (23 August 1919 – 19 February 2017) was a Danish physician, remembered primarily for his participation in resistance activities under the German occupation of Denmark in the early 1940s.  Together with his sister, Elsebet Kieler, he published Frit Denmark or Free Denmark, an illegal newspaper. As a member of the Holger Danske resistance group, he helped hundreds of Danish Jews to escape to Sweden and avoid extermination.

On 21 May 1944 Jørgen Kieler smuggled the last letter written by condemned resistance fighter Georg Quistgaard out of prison.

Despite capture by the Germans and time in a concentration camp, he returned to Denmark after the war and then completed his studies in the United States. In 1980, he became director of research at Kræftens Bekæmpelse (the Danish Cancer Research Institute).

Kieler wrote a number of books about the German occupation and about concentration camp syndrome.

On 19 February 2017, Kieler died at age 97.

Bibliography (selected)

References

 Kieler, Jørgen: Resistance Fighter. Gefen Publishing House, 2007. .

1919 births
2017 deaths
Danish resistance members
Danish male writers
Danish oncologists